Two Lions to Venice is a 2020 internationally co-produced comedy-drama film directed by Jonid Jorgji. It was selected as the Albanian entry for the Best International Feature Film at the 94th Academy Awards.

Plot
On their way to the Venice Film Festival, two Albanian filmmakers decide to make an adult film after meeting  porn stars.

Cast
 Natalia De Maria as Lola
 Kastriot Çaushi as Kaçi
 Vasjan Lami as Vani
 Alessandra Bonarotta as Ginevra

See also
 List of submissions to the 94th Academy Awards for Best International Feature Film
 List of Albanian submissions for the Academy Award for Best International Feature Film

References

External links
 

2020 films
2020 comedy-drama films
Albanian comedy-drama films
Czech comedy-drama films
Italian comedy-drama films
British comedy-drama films
Albanian-language films
2020s Italian-language films
2020 multilingual films

2020s Italian films
2020s British films
Films about films